27 Steps of May is a 2018 Indonesian drama film directed by Ravi Bharwani and written by Rayya Makarim. It stars Raihaanun, Lukman Sardi and Ario Bayu.

The film had its world premiere at the 23rd Busan International Film Festival during the program A Window on Asian Cinema.

Premise
May, a sexual violence victim during the May 1998 riots, withdraws from life. Meanwhile, her father deals with guilt by being a boxer.

Cast

Release
27 Steps of May had its world premiere at the 23rd Busan International Film Festival on 8 October 2018. The film had its Indonesian premiere at the 13th Jogja-NETPAC Asian Film Festival, where it won the main prize Golden Hanoman Award. The film was released to the theatres in Indonesia on 27 April 2019. It garnered 57,416 spectators during its run and grossed Rp 2.2 billion ($146,830).

Netflix acquired its distribution rights, releasing it on 1 October 2021.

Accolades

References

External links
 
 Official trailer

2018 drama films
2010s Indonesian-language films
Indonesian drama films
Films about sexual harassment
Films about father–daughter relationships